Sibling Revelry is the debut album by American progressive rock band The Flyin' Ryan Brothers, released in 1996.

Track listing

Personnel
Jimmy Ryan – electric guitars, acoustic guitars, bass, keyboards, EBow, drum programming, sequencers, samplers, sound effects, lead vocals, backing vocals, production, arrangements, mixing, design
Johnny Ryan – electric guitars, acoustic guitars, bass, keyboards, EBow, drum programming, sequencers, samplers, sound effects, lead vocals, backing vocals, production, arrangements, mixing
Michael Angelo – lead guitar on "Struttin'" and "X Factor", executive production, mixing
Tommy Dziallo – lead guitar on "Struttin'" and "Mountains of Yore"
Pat Lilley – mastering
Rob Kistner – layout
Vin Newman – photography

References

The Flyin' Ryan Brothers albums
1996 albums